Peña Blanca is a corregimiento in Las Tablas District, Los Santos Province, Panama with a population of 875 as of 2010. Its population as of 1990 was 582; its population as of 2000 was 750.

References

Corregimientos of Los Santos Province